In mathematics, a moment problem arises as the result of trying to invert the mapping that takes a measure μ to the sequences of moments

More generally, one may consider

for an arbitrary sequence of functions Mn.

Introduction 

In the classical setting, μ is a measure on the real line, and M is the sequence { xn : n = 0, 1, 2, ... }. In this form the question appears in probability theory, asking whether there is a  probability measure having specified mean, variance and so on, and whether it is unique.

There are three named classical moment problems: the Hamburger moment problem in which the support of μ is allowed to be the whole real line; the Stieltjes moment problem, for [0, +∞); and the Hausdorff moment problem for a bounded interval, which without loss of generality may be taken as [0, 1].

Existence

A sequence of numbers mn is the sequence of moments of a measure μ if and only if a certain positivity condition is fulfilled; namely, the Hankel matrices Hn,

should be positive semi-definite. In the univariate case, a non-negative polynomial can always be written as a sum of squares. So the linear functional  is positive for all the non-negative polynomials in the univariate case. A condition of similar form is necessary and sufficient for the existence of a measure  supported on a given interval [a, b].

One way to prove these results is to consider the linear functional  that sends a polynomial

 

to

 

If mkn are the moments of some measure μ supported on [a, b], then evidently

Vice versa, if holds, one can apply the M. Riesz extension theorem and extend  to a functional on the space of continuous functions with compact support C0([a, b]), so that

By the Riesz representation theorem, holds iff there exists a measure μ supported on [a, b], such that

 

for every ƒ ∈ C0([a, b]).

Using a representation theorem for positive polynomials on [a, b],  one can reformulate as a condition on Hankel matrices.

Uniqueness (or determinacy) 

The uniqueness of μ in the Hausdorff moment problem follows from the Weierstrass approximation theorem, which states that polynomials are dense under the uniform norm in the space of continuous functions on [0, 1]. There are distributions, such as log-normal distributions, which have finite moments for all the positive integers but where other distributions have the same moments.

Variations 

An important variation is the truncated moment problem, which studies the properties of measures with fixed first k moments (for a finite k). Results on the truncated moment problem have numerous applications to extremal problems, optimisation and limit theorems in probability theory.

See also 
Stieltjes moment problem
Hamburger moment problem
Hausdorff moment problem
Moment (mathematics)
Carleman's condition
Hankel matrix

References

 (translated from the Russian by N. Kemmer)
 (Translated from the Russian by D. Louvish)
 

Mathematical analysis
Hilbert space
Probability problems
Moment (mathematics)
Mathematical problems
Real algebraic geometry
Optimization in vector spaces